Xylotoles is a genus of beetle in the family Cerambycidae. It contains several species, including Xylotoles costatus, once thought extinct. The longhorn beetles belonging to genus Xylotoles is classified as Endangered (EN) on the IUCN Red List.

subgenus Trichoxylotoles  
 Xylotoles apicalis Broun, 1923
 Xylotoles scissicauda Bates, 1874
 Xylotoles segrex Olliff, 1889

subgenus Xylotoles
 Xylotoles aegrotus Bates, 1874
 Xylotoles apicicauda Breuning, 1943
 Xylotoles costatus Pascoe, 1875 - Pitt Island Longhorn
 Xylotoles fasciatus Sharp, 1886
 Xylotoles germanus Sharp, 1886
 Xylotoles griseus (Fabricius, 1775) - Fig Longhorn
 Xylotoles inornatus Broun, 1880
 Xylotoles laetus White, 1846
 Xylotoles lynceus (Fabricius, 1775)
 Xylotoles nanus Bates, 1874
 Xylotoles nudus Bates, 1874
 Xylotoles parvulus White, 1846
 Xylotoles pattesoni Olliff, 1888
 Xylotoles persimilis Breuning, 1940
 Xylotoles pulchellus Bates, 1874
 Xylotoles pygmaeus Broun, 1923
 Xylotoles rugicollis Bates, 1874
 Xylotoles sandageri Broun, 1886
 Xylotoles traversii Pascoe, 1876

incertae sedis
 Xylotoles selwini Olliff, 1888

References

Dorcadiini
Cerambycidae genera
Taxonomy articles created by Polbot